Leonardas Andriekus (born July 15, 1914 in Barstyčiai, district of Mažeikiai, Lithuania - 2003) was a Lithuanian poet.

Lithuanian male poets
1914 births
2003 deaths
20th-century poets